Diana Lynn Ossana (born August 24, 1949) is an American writer who has collaborated on writing screenplays, teleplays, and novels with author Larry McMurtry since they first worked together in 1992, on the semi-fictionalized biography Pretty Boy Floyd. She won an Academy Award for Best Adapted Screenplay, a Writers' Guild of America Award, a BAFTA Award and a Golden Globe Award for her screenplay of Ang Lee's Brokeback Mountain, along with McMurtry and adapted from the short story of the same name by Annie Proulx. She is a published author in her own right of several short stories and essays.

Biography
Ossana was born to an Italian immigrant father, Livio A.A. Ossana, and Marian (Anyan) of Irish/Welsh heritage and raised in St. Louis, Missouri. She attended Eastern New Mexico University, where she double majored in English and political science, and moved to Arizona in 1977.

Ossana first read the Annie Proulx short story Brokeback Mountain in the October 13, 1997 issue of The New Yorker magazine. She immediately urged her writing partner McMurtry to read it and asked him if he felt they could write a screenplay based upon the story. McMurtry agreed they could. They wrote Proulx asking her for an option to the short story in order to write a screenplay. Proulx replied that although she did not see the potential for a movie in the story, she would agree to their option. Ossana and McMurtry proceeded to write the script, which they completed in early 1998. Ossana's and McMurtry's screenplay for Brokeback Mountain won the Academy Award for Best Writing (Adapted Screenplay) as well as the Golden Globe Award for Best Screenplay, the BAFTA Award for Best Adapted Screenplay and the Writers Guild of America Award. Ossana, a producer on the film, also won the Golden Globe Award for Best Drama and a Best Film award (shared with James Schamus) for Best Film. The film was released in the United States in December 2005. Brokeback received widespread critical acclaim and it won the Golden Lion (Best Film) award at the Venice Film Festival, a Best Film award at the BAFTA Awards, and the Golden Globe Award for Best Picture - Drama. As a producer, Ossana joined cast and crew during the three months of shooting in Canada.

She currently resides in Texas.

Awards and nominations

Academy Awards
2005: Best Picture (nominated), Brokeback Mountain
2005: Best Adapted Screenplay, Brokeback Mountain

BAFTA Film Awards
2005: Best Film, Brokeback Mountain
2005: Best Screenplay - Adapted, Brokeback Mountain

Golden Globe Awards
2005: Best Screenplay, Brokeback Mountain
2005: Best Drama, Brokeback Mountain

PGA Awards
2005: Best Film, Brokeback Mountain

WGA Awards
2005: Best Screenplay - Adapted, Brokeback Mountain

References

External links

HTML version of production notes for Brokeback Mountain (with an interview with Ossana about the film and some biographical information)
Guide to the Larry McMurtry and Diana Ossana papers at Rice University (with some background information)
"My Time on Brokeback Mountain" (Essay by Diana Osanna on advocate.com, January 2006)

Best Adapted Screenplay Academy Award winners
Best Adapted Screenplay BAFTA Award winners
Eastern New Mexico University alumni
American writers of Italian descent
Living people
American women screenwriters
People from St. Louis
Writers Guild of America Award winners
Best Screenplay Golden Globe winners
Filmmakers who won the Best Film BAFTA Award
Golden Globe Award-winning producers
American women film producers
Film producers from Missouri
Screenwriters from Missouri
1949 births
20th-century American screenwriters
20th-century American women writers
21st-century American screenwriters
21st-century American women writers